"Yokubomono" (欲望者, Desirer) is the 18th single by Japanese idol girl group NMB48. It was released on 4 April 2018. It reached number-one on the weekly Oricon Singles Chart with 193,740 copies sold. It also reached the first place on the Billboard Japan Hot 100. This is the first NMB48 single to sell less than their debut single in the first week.

Track listing

Type A

Type B

Type C

Type D

Theater version

Personnel

"Yokubomono (Senbatsu)" 
The performers of the main single are:
Team N: Miori Ichikawa, Cocona Umeyama, Airi Tanigawa, Ayaka Yamamoto, 
Team M: Momoka Iwata, Yuuka Kato, Nagisa Shibuya, Miru Shiroma, Akari Yoshida
Team BII: Azusa Uemura, Yuuri Ota, Eriko Jo, Rei Jonishi, Sae Murase, Fuuko Yagura

"Thinking time" 
"Thinking time" was performed by Akari Yoshida:
Team M: Akari Yoshida

"Hankyuu Densha" 
"Hankyuu Densha" was performed by Team N members, consisting of:
Team N: Yuki Azuma, Miori Ichikawa, Cocona Umeyama, Konomi Kusaka, Narumi Koga, Karin Kojima, Airi Tanigawa, Kokoro Naiki, Momoka Hayashi, Shion Mori, Yuzuha Hongou, Mao Mita, Rina Yamao,

"Yojijukugo Girls" 
"Yojijukugo Girls" was performed by Team M members, consisting of:
Team M: Ishida Yuumi, Iso Kanae, Iwata Momoka, Uno Mizuki, Odan Mai, Kato Yuuka, Kawakami Chihiro, Kawakami Rena, Shibuya Nagisa, Nakano Reina, Nishizawa Rurina, Yasuda Momone, Yamada Suzu, Yoshida Akari

"Saji wo Nageru na!' 
"Saji wo Nageru na!" was performed by Team BII members, consisting of:
Team BII: Akashi Natsuko, Ishizuka Akari, Ijiri Anna, Uemura Azusa, Ota Yuuri, Okita Ayaka, Kushiro Rina, Shimizu Rika, Jo Eriko, Jonishi Rei, Takei Sara, Nakagawa Mion, Mizuta Shiori, Murase Sae, Morita Ayaka,

"Good Timing" 
"Good Timing" was performed by 5 members:
Team N: Umeyama Cocona, 
Team M: Iwata Momoka, Yamada Suzu
Team BII: Jonishi Rei

"Gokai" 
"Gokai" was performed by Shiroma Miru & Yagura Fuuko:
Team M: Shiroma Miru
Team BII: Yagura Fuuko

References 

2018 singles
2018 songs
Japanese-language songs
NMB48 songs
Oricon Weekly number-one singles
Billboard Japan Hot 100 number-one singles